Semanotus is a genus of beetles in the family Cerambycidae, first described by Étienne Mulsant in 1839.

Species 
Semanotus contains the following species:
 Semanotus algiricus Pic, 1905
 Semanotus amethystinus (LeConte, 1853)
 Semanotus amplus (Casey, 1912)
 Semanotus australis Giesbert, 1993
 Semanotus basalis (Casey, 1924)
 Semanotus bifasciatus (Motschulsky, 1875)
 Semanotus conformis Casey, 1924
 Semanotus japonicus Lacordaire, 1869
 Semanotus juniperi (Fisher, 1915)
 Semanotus laurasii (Croissandeau, 1890)
 Semanotus ligneus (Fabricius, 1787)
 Semanotus litigiosus (Casey, 1891)
 Semanotus nigroalbus Holzschuh, 1984
 Semanotus russicus (Fabricius, 1777)
 Semanotus semenovi Okunev, 1933
 Semanotus sinoauster Gressitt, 1951
 Semanotus terminatus Casey, 1912
 Semanotus undatus (Linnaeus, 1758)
 Semanotus yakushimensis Makihara, 2004

References

Callidiini